Günther Haensch (April 22, 1923, Munich, Germany – May 10, 2018, Augsburg, Germany) was a German linguist and lexicographer. A specialist on Catalan and Aragonese dialectology, he has also published more general dictionaries and works on Spanish and French culture.

Life

Günther Haensch was born in Munich. Between 1945 and 1951 he studied Romance languages and history at Geneva, Barcelona and Munich. From 1968 to 1973 he was Professor of Romance Languages and Cultural Studies at the Economics Faculty of the University of Erlangen-Nuremberg. From 1973 to 1992, he was Professor of Applied Linguistics (Romance Languages) at the University of Augsburg and director of its language center.

References

1923 births
2018 deaths
Linguists from Germany
German lexicographers
People from Munich
Recipients of the Cross of the Order of Merit of the Federal Republic of Germany